The  Zygons are an extraterrestrial race in the long-running British science fiction television programme Doctor Who.  The Zygons have shape-shifting abilities, allowing them to replicate the appearance of another being. Limited by the small size of their force, they rely on shape-shifting and their organic space craft to conceal their numbers and seize power on Earth. The Zygons were conceived by writer Robert Banks Stewart.

Tenth and Fourteenth Doctor actor David Tennant has stated that they are his favourite villains in the series.

A new species of parasitic wasp, first described in 2019, was named Choeras zygon in reference to the Zygons.

Appearances

Television
The Zygons first appeared in the 1975 serial Terror of the Zygons, in which they planned to conquer Earth following the destruction of the Zygon homeworld. One of their spacecraft, commanded by warlord Broton, crash-landed into Loch Ness in Antiquity. The Zygons used a Skarasen (a creature that provides milk for their sustenance and which had become known as the Loch Ness Monster by humans) to attack an energy conference in London. The plan was foiled and Broton and his crew were killed, due to the intervention of the Fourth Doctor and the United Nations Intelligence Taskforce (UNIT). The Skarasen retreated into the depths of Loch Ness.

The Zygons are briefly mentioned (but not seen) in the Eleventh Doctor episode "The Pandorica Opens" (2010) as one of the many races in an alliance against the Doctor. In the 2012 episode, "The Power of Three", a Zygon ship is hidden beneath the Savoy Hotel where the Doctor takes Amy Pond and Rory Williams on their wedding anniversary. All the Zygons are disguised as hotel staff.

The Zygons returned in 2013 in "The Day of the Doctor", the 50th anniversary episode of the programme. The episode hints the stellar explosion (said to have destroyed their homeworld in the 1975 serial) was an effect of the Time War. A squad places themselves in suspended animation in Elizabethan England, planning to awaken in 2013 to infiltrate the Tower of London's Black Archive disguised as UNIT members. The scheme is foiled by the intervention of the Tenth Doctor, the Eleventh Doctor and the War Doctor. When UNIT is overrun by Zygon doppelgangers, Kate Lethbridge-Stewart threatens to detonate a nuclear device to prevent Zygon access to UNIT's storehouse of alien technology. The Doctors successfully negotiate a truce between the two species.

The ramifications of this treaty are explored in the ninth series two-parter "The Zygon Invasion" / "The Zygon Inversion" (2015). Zygons were allowed to re-home on Earth on the condition that they disguised themselves as people and lived incognito. In the intervening time, they developed the ability to retain a person's likeness after the death of the original and shapeshift into someone based on a telepathic scan of a nearby being. Although older generations of Zygons were committed to integration with human communities, the younger generations resented being forced to live as humans and quickly radicalised. The radicals and UNIT once again enter stalemate at the Tower of London, both poised to destroy one another, but the Twelfth Doctor makes an impassioned plea and convinces the radical Zygon leader to understand the lasting peace which the treaty was written to preserve.

Print
Terror of The Zygons was novelized by Target in 1976, written by Terrance Dicks, under the title Doctor Who and the Loch Ness Monster.  The book further expounded on the concept of the Zygon "sting," poisonous barbs protruding from their hands, which explains why, in the television episode, the Zygons were able to inflict pain on other beings with a mere touch.  (The original shooting script for the episode also included references to the sting but the on-screen portrayal of the concept failed to make it clear to the audience.)

The comic story "Skywatch-7", written by Alan McKenzie (under the pseudonym "Maxwell Stockbridge") and illustrated by Mick Austin, features a UNIT team encountering a single Zygon at a remote base.  It was first published, in two parts, in Doctor Who Monthly #58 and the Doctor Who Winter Special 1981.

The Eighth Doctor encountered the Zygons in the spin-off novel The Bodysnatchers by Mark Morris,  which also named the now-destroyed Zygon homeworld as Zygor. The novel also revealed that Zygor had been destroyed as a result of an attack by an arachnid alien race from Tau Ceti, the Xaranti. The Doctor, his companion Sam Jones, and the Fourth Doctor's old acquaintance Professor Litefoot are able to stop the Zygons by poisoning the milk supply (although the Doctor had intended to merely drug them and miscalculated the dose), the Doctor taking the survivors to another planet.

The Zygons appear in the New Series Adventures novel Sting of the Zygons by Stephen Cole,  featuring the Tenth Doctor and Martha Jones, which is set in the Lake District in 1909. A plan to set up a royal funeral where the Zygons could replace the rulers of various nations is thwarted through the Doctor's intervention, as well as a Zygon civil war when one of their two Skarasens is killed.

Audio
The Zygons have been featured in three audio plays produced by BBV, Homeland by Paul Dearing, Absolution (not to be confused with the Big Finish play Absolution) by Paul Ebbs and The Barnacled Baby by Anthony Keetch.

They made their Big Finish debut in the Eighth Doctor audio adventure The Zygon Who Fell to Earth by Paul Magrs and returned in Death in Blackpool by Alan Barnes.

The Zygons also feature in Zygon Hunt by Nicholas Briggs, facing the Fourth Doctor and Leela.

Merchandise

The Zygons were featured in the second Doctor Who Weetabix promotional set and were card number 9 in the Typhoo tea card set.  Harlequin Miniatures produced two 28 mm figures, and Fine Art Castings produced two Zygon figurines, sized 80 mm and 40 mm. In October 2016 Recent onscreen versions have now been released in 28mm, by Warlord Games.

In 2008, a Zygon figure was released by Character Options in the first wave of their classic Doctor Who toy line.

On 26 June 2014 a Zygon as featured in "The Day of the Doctor" was released as part of the ongoing Doctor Who figurine collection from Eaglemoss.  The Zygon will be the 23rd in the regular line of releases.

Zygon (BBV production)

Zygon is a spin-off drama production from BBV, featuring the Zygons. Early drafts were written by Lance Parkin and later ones by Jonathan Blum, although both authors removed their names from the final version (which was heavily rewritten again). It was eventually released in 2008 as Zygon: When Being You Just Isn't Enough  (with an 18 certificate due to scenes of an adult nature), after a post-production period of about 5 years.

See also
They Live

References

External links
 

Doctor Who races
Extraterrestrial supervillains
Fictional extraterrestrial life forms
Fictional shapeshifters